The 1989 VFL Panasonic Cup was the Victorian Football League Pre-season Cup competition played in its entirety before the Victorian Football League's 1989 Premiership Season began. It culminated the final in March 1989.

Games

1st Round

|- bgcolor="#CCCCFF"
| Home team
| Home team score
| Away team
| Away team score
| Ground
| Crowd
| Date
|- bgcolor="#FFFFFF"
| St Kilda
| 10.8 (68)
| West Coast
| 14.10 (94)
| VFL Park
| 10,085
| Wednesday 8 February
|- bgcolor="#FFFFFF"
| Melbourne
| 8.15 (63)
|  Sydney
| 6.11 (47)
| VFL Park
| 11,554
| Saturday 11 February
|- bgcolor="#FFFFFF"
| Fitzroy
| 17.18 (120)
| Richmond
| 12.8 (80)
| VFL Park
| 8,670
| Sunday 12 February
|- bgcolor="#FFFFFF"
| Carlton
| 12.7 (79)
| North Melbourne
| 10.14 (74)
| VFL Park
| 9,494
| Wednesday 15 February
|- bgcolor="#FFFFFF"
| Collingwood
| 9.12 (66)
| Footscray
| 9.13 (67)
| VFL Park
| 21,158
| Saturday 18 February
|- bgcolor="#FFFFFF"
| Essendon
| 15.14 (104)
| Brisbane
| 10.3 (63)
| VFL Park
| 8,496
| Wednesday 22 February

Quarter-finals

|- bgcolor="#CCCCFF"
| Home team
| Home team score
| Away team
| Away team score
| Ground
| Crowd
| Date
|- bgcolor="#FFFFFF"
|  Hawthorn
| 13.10 (88)
| West Coast
| 14.5 (89)
| VFL Park
| 9,605
| Saturday 25 February
|- bgcolor="#FFFFFF"
|  Fitzroy
| 9.16 (70)
| Melbourne
| 10.13 (73)
| VFL Park
| 6,695
| Sunday 26 February
|- bgcolor="#FFFFFF"
| Carlton
| 14.11 (95)
| Footscray
| 8.14 (62)
| VFL Park
| 9,801
| Wednesday 1 March
|- bgcolor="#FFFFFF"
| Essendon
| 6.8 (44)
| Geelong
| 16.14 (110)
| VFL Park
| 20,105
| Saturday 4 March

Semi-finals

|- bgcolor="#CCCCFF"
| Home team
| Home team score
| Away team
| Away team score
| Ground
| Crowd
| Date
|- bgcolor="#FFFFFF"
| Melbourne
| 7.13 (55)
| West Coast
| 6.18 (54)
| VFL Park
| 7,185
| Wednesday 8 March
|- bgcolor="#FFFFFF"
| Carlton
| 5.9 (39)
| Geelong
| 16.16 (112)
| VFL Park
| 23,522
| Saturday 11 March

Final

|- bgcolor="#CCCCFF"
| Home team
| Home team score
| Away team
| Away team score
| Ground
| Crowd
| Date
|- bgcolor="#FFFFFF"
| Geelong
| 9.13 (67)
| Melbourne
| 10.16 (76)
| VFL Park
| 48,729
| Saturday 18 March

See also

List of Australian Football League night premiers
1989 VFL season

References

Australian Football League pre-season competition
Panasonic Cup, 1989